Q (released in the United States as Desire) is a 2011 French erotic drama film written and directed by Laurent Bouhnik.

Plot
Set in Cherbourg, France and in a social context deteriorated by a countrywide economic crisis, the life of several people are turned upside down after they meet Cecile, a character who symbolizes desire. Cecile is a 20-year-old woman whose father recently died and she sets about to bury her grief by having sexual relations with various lovers of people that she knows and does not know. Chance is Cecile's boyfriend and a petty criminal who loves her, but he cannot satisfy her constant carnal desires. Matt is an auto mechanic friend of Chance whose girlfriend Alice refuses to have sex with him. Cecile also gives advice to her friends about how and how not to pleasure men and women. Unable to find inner peace through various sexual encounters with Chance, Matt and even Alice, Cecile finally discovers another path to healing.

Cast

References

External links
 

2011 films
2011 drama films
2011 LGBT-related films
2010s erotic drama films
Female bisexuality in film
Films directed by Laurent Bouhnik
Films set in Normandy
Films shot in Normandy
French erotic drama films
French LGBT-related films
Lesbian-related films
2010s French films